Shushan Samveli Petrosyan (born 23 September 1967) is an Armenian singer, Honored Artist of Armenia, and a former deputy in the National Assembly of Armenia.

Biography 
Shushan Petrosyan was born on 23 September 1967 in Yerevan. In 1987, she graduated from Terlemezyan College of Fine Arts' painting program, and in 1993, she graduated from Yerevan State Academy of Fine Arts' graphics program. From 1989 to 1991, she worked in "Ardzagank" theater-studio (Metro theater) as a costume designer. She composed three performances: "Mythical Eternity", "Antigone", and "The Lord and the Servant". From 1994-1997, she worked at the State Song Theater. In 1996 she became a soloist for the Armenian State Philharmonic. From 2002-2003, she worked as a lecturer at the Yerevan State Institute of Cinema and Theater. In 2005, she became an academician of the International Academy of Nature and Society. In 2006, she was awarded the title of Honored Artist of Armenia.

She is married to Arman Harutyunyan and has two children.

Music career 
Petrosyan participated in concerts organized for the representatives of the Armenian Diaspora in Armenia and abroad and has given solo concerts. She dedicated the song "Sparapet" («Սպարապետ») to Vazgen Sargsyan, and often sang at political events and parties organized by high-ranking Armenian officials and the rich. She regularly participated in the presidential election campaign of the National Assembly of Armenia, singing during the campaigns of the Republican Party of Armenia. She has received numerous awards during her musical career, including:

 1993 Grand Prix (Sharm Show International Festival) 
 1996 "Best Singer of the Year" ("Fireball" Awards) 
 2000 "Armenian star of the 20th century" ("Astgh" festival) 
 2000 "Best Female Performer" ("Anush" Awards, USA) 
 2004 "The best voice of independent Armenia" ("Crane" festival) 
 2009 "Diva" award (annual song festival, USA)

Political career

Deputy work 
On 6 May 2012, Petrosyan was elected as a deputy of the National Assembly of Armenia by the pre-election list of the Republican Party of Armenia. She was a member of the NA Standing Committee on Science, Education, Culture, Youth and Sports.

The Armenian society did not receive Petrosyan becoming an MP well.

Petrosyan has not shown much political activity during her parliamentary career. She rarely makes speeches, she votes for the projects, which are voted by all the RPA deputies. She sometimes holds press conferences, during which she supports the chairman of the ruling Republican Party of Armenia and its members.

Petrosyan is considered one of the most silent deputies of the National Assembly, as she has never made a speech or submitted any bill for discussion.

Relations with the opposition 
Petrosyan thinks that the RA opposition is composed of immoral people, as the latter often approaches the actions of the RPA and RA President Serzh Sargsyan.

Russian Griboyedov Club 
Petrosyan actively participates in the meetings of the Griboyedov Club, founded by the head of the largest Russian media holding in Armenia, Dmitry Kiselyov.

Discography 
 Im Anush Hayreniq (2001)
 Await Us Ararat (2003)
 Mtorumner (2003)
 The Best (2007)
 Hanrapetutyun 15 (2007)

References 

Honored artists of Armenia
Republican Party of Armenia politicians
1967 births
20th-century Armenian women singers
Living people
21st-century Armenian women singers